Hohhot East railway station is a railway station of the Zhangjiakou–Hohhot high-speed railway.  It is located in Xincheng District, Hohhot, Inner Mongolia.

Hohhot Metro 

Hohhot East railway station is served by a station on Line 1 of the Hohhot Metro. 
The metro station opened on 29 December 2019.

References

Hohhot Metro stations
Railway stations in China opened in 2019
Railway stations in Inner Mongolia
Hohhot
Buildings and structures in Hohhot